Church of the Nativity of the Theotokos  is a Serbian Orthodox church in Drežnica, Croatia.

See also
 List of Serbian Orthodox churches in Croatia

References

Serbian Orthodox church buildings in Croatia
Buildings and structures in Karlovac County
Churches completed in 1842
19th-century churches in Croatia
19th-century Serbian Orthodox church buildings